Radinsky is a surname. Notable people with the surname include: 

Kira Radinsky,  Israeli computer scientist, inventor and entrepreneur
Leonard Radinsky (1937–1985), American paleontologist
Scott Radinsky (born 1968), baseball player and singer

See also
Radinska
Radzinsky
Radzinski

References